This is the complete list of extant icons created in Russia before and during the reign of Alexander Nevsky (1220–63).

1000–1130

1130–1200

1200–1250

See also 
 Russian icons

Sources 
 В. Д. Сарабьянов, Э. С. Смирнова. История древнерусской живописи. М., ПСТГУ, 2007.

Russian icons
Kievan Rus culture

Medieval art